Lend Me Your Ears may refer to:

 Lend Me Your Ears (Jeremy Steig, Eddie Gómez and Joe Chambers album), 1978
 Lend Me Your Ears (Ray Stevens album), 1990
 Lend Me Your Ears (book), a 2003 book by Boris Johnson
 Lend Me Your Ears (video series), a 2014 video series by John Cantlie
 "Friends, Romans, countrymen, lend me your ears", the first line of speech by Mark Antony in the play Julius Caesar